Faleata Ovals are four cricket grounds in Apia, Samoa. The ground is owned by the Samoa International Cricket Association. It has hosted matches in the 2019 Pacific Games from 8 to 13 July 2019.

International record

Faleata Oval 2

Twenty20 International five-wicket hauls

The following table summarizes the five-wicket hauls taken in T20Is at this venue.

Faleata Oval 3

Twenty20 International five-wicket hauls

The following table summarizes the five-wicket hauls taken in T20Is at this venue.

References

Cricket grounds in Samoa
Buildings and structures in Samoa
Sports venues in Samoa